Puntius kelumi is a species of cyprinid fish in the genus Puntius. It is found in Sri Lanka.

The fish is named in honor or Sri Lankan naturalist Kelum Manamendra-Arachchi.

Description
Identified by other Puntius species by last unbranched dorsal-fin ray becomes smooth. rostral barbels absent, but maxillary barbels present. 20-23 lateral-line scales.

References 

Puntius
Taxa named by Rohan Pethiyagoda
Taxa named by Anjana Silva
Taxa named by Kalana Maduwage
Taxa named by Madhava Meegaskumbura
Fish described in 2008